Senator Gillis may refer to:

Hugh Gillis (1918–2013), Georgia State Senate
James Lisle Gillis (1792–1881), Pennsylvania State Senate
Jim L. Gillis Jr. (1916–2018), Georgia State Senate